Tahsildar Gari Ammayi is a 1971 Indian Telugu-language drama film directed by K. S. Prakash Rao. It is an adaptation of Kavilipati Vijayalakshmi's novel Vidhi Vinyaasaalu that was serialised the same year in the newspaper Andhra Prabha. The film stars Sobhan Babu, Nagabhushanam and Jamuna. It was released on 12 November 1971, and became a commercial success.

Plot

Cast 
 Sobhan Babu as Prasada Rao and Vasu
 Master Rajkumar as young Vasu
 Nagabhushanam as Venkataramaiah
 Jamuna as Madhumathi
 Chandrakala as Padmaja
 Raavi Kondala Rao as Rajaskeharam
 Sakshi Ranga Rao as Gopalam

Production 
Vidhi Vinyaasaalu was a novel written by Kavilipati Vijayalakshmi and serialised in 1971 in the newspaper Andhra Prabha. Suryanarayana and Sathyanarayana of Sathya Chitra purchased the film rights to this novel, and engaged K. S. Prakash Rao to direct the adaptation, titled Tahsildar Gari Ammayi. Prakash Rao also wrote the screenplay, while N. R. Nandi wrote the dialogues, and S. Venkatarathnam handled the cinematography. Prakash Rao's son K. Raghavendra Rao and G. C. Sekhar were associate directors, while his niece Mohana was the art director.

Soundtrack 
The soundtrack was composed by K. V. Mahadevan, while Aatreya wrote the lyrics.

Release and reception 
Tahsildar Gari Ammayi was released on 12 November 1971, and became a commercial success, running for over 100 days in theatres. For his performance, Sobhan Babu won the Andhra Film Fans Association Award for Best Actor. Akkineni Nageswara Rao, who presented him the award, said, "He is a good actor. He is the future hope of the film industry."

References

External links 
 

1970s Telugu-language films
1971 drama films
Films based on Indian novels
Films directed by K. S. Prakash Rao
Films scored by K. V. Mahadevan
Indian drama films